Manisha Panna  (born 20 April 1991) is an Indian professional footballer who plays as a midfielder for East Coast Railway and the India women's national football team. She was part of the team at the 2015–16 AFC Women's Olympic Qualifying Tournament. She previously played for Gokulam Kerala in the Indian Women's League.

International
Manisha was part of the Indian team since 2015. She plays professionally as defender in the national team. She was in the regular squad member since she started. She first played in 2015-16 AFC Women's Olympic Qualifying Tournament. Later she was also played both South Asian Games and 2016 SAFF Women's Championship and won both tournaments.

International goals

Honours

India
 SAFF Women's Championship: 2016
 South Asian Games Gold medal: 2016

Gokulam Kerala
Indian Women's League: 2019–20

Odisha
 Senior Women's National Football Championship: 2010–11
 National Games Silver medal: 2022

Railways
 Senior Women's National Football Championship: 2015–16

References

External links 
 Manisha Panna at All India Football Federation
 

1991 births
Living people
Indian women's footballers
People from Sundergarh district
Women's association football midfielders
India women's international footballers
Sportswomen from Odisha
Footballers from Odisha
Eastern Sporting Union players
Gokulam Kerala FC Women players
South Asian Games gold medalists for India
South Asian Games medalists in football
Indian Women's League players
21st-century Indian women
21st-century Indian people